Penzin is a municipality  in the Rostock district, in Mecklenburg-Vorpommern, Germany. It is located at the northeast of Germany and belongs to the amt of Bützow Land.

References

External links